James J. Adams (born 1868) was an American major league baseball catcher. He played professionally for the St. Louis Browns.

Career
Adams was born in 1868 in East St. Louis, Illinois. He played in one game for the St. Louis Browns on April 21, 1890. He hit one single in four at-bats during the game. In addition to his brief appearance for the Browns, he played on various minor league teams from 1889–1892 and again in 1899–1900.

He was briefly the player/manager of the Aspen, Colorado team in the Colorado State League in 1889.

References

External links 

Baseball Almanac

1868 births
Baseball players from Illinois
Major League Baseball catchers
St. Louis Browns (AA) players
19th-century baseball players
Year of death unknown
Sportspeople from East St. Louis, Illinois
Pueblo Ponies players
Aspen (minor league baseball) players
Fort Worth Panthers players
Carthage (minor league baseball) players
Ottumwa Coal Palaces players
Macon Central City players
New Orleans Pelicans (baseball) players
Memphis Giants players
Springfield Ponies players
Lawrence (minor league baseball) players
Fitchburg (minor league baseball) players
Hampton Crabs players
Minor league baseball managers